Sabotage/Live is a live album by John Cale. It was recorded at CBGB, New York on 13–16 June 1979, and released by SPY Records in December 1979.

Release

A studio version of "Mercenaries (Ready for War)" was released as a single in the US on 14 March 1980. The sleeve notes that on the B-Side the “vocal distortion (is) intended.”

It was later reissued on CD by A&M Records Canada, and reissued again in the UK by Diesel Motor Records. The Diesel Motor CD reissue contains four extra tracks. The first three are originally from the Animal Justice EP, while the fourth was the B-side of the "Mercenaries (Ready for War)" single (the A-side, which was an entirely different recording than the live album version, was not included as the master tape is lost). However, this was included on the download available on the ZE Records website from 2011.

Critical reception
NME said of the band, "What they lack in finesse they make up for with a remorseless drive that equally befits Cale's cold-blooded, gut-churning music of fear – but puts the weight on the gut-churning. In fact it's surprising that there isn't a song about a mass-murderer amongst them; instead, for the first side at least, Cale is in the grip of post-nuclear mental tremors, raving obsessively about espionage, atom bombs and the dogs of war."

Track listing

Personnel
 John Cale - vocals, piano, guitar, fretless bass, viola
 Marc Aaron - lead guitar
 Joe Bidewell - keyboards, vocals
 Doug Bowne - drums, vocals
 Deerfrance - percussion, vocals
 George Scott - bass, vocals
Technical
Jane Friedman - executive producer
Charlie Martin - recording
Warren Frank, John Cale - mixing
John Vogel - art direction
Hugh Brown - photography 
Animal Justice EP
 John Cale - vocals
 Ritchie Flieger - guitar
 Jimmy Bain - bass
 Bruce Brody - Moog synthesizer
 Kevin Currie - drums
Jane Friedman - backing vocals on "Chicken Shit"

"Rosegarden Funeral of Sores"
 John Cale - vocals, bass, Wurlitzer piano
 Michael Mason - rhythm/drum machine
"Mercenaries (Ready for War)" single version recorded at Plaza Sound, New York City
John Cale - vocals, organ, guitar
Joe Bidewell - Hammond organ, vocals
Peter Muny - bass guitar, vocals
Deerfrance - vocals
Robert Medici - drums, vocals
Sturgis Nikides - lead guitar Gibson Firebird

References 

Albums produced by John Cale
1977 EPs
Live EPs
John Cale live albums
1979 live albums
Albums recorded at CBGB
I.R.S. Records live albums